Message from Home is an album by saxophonist Pharoah Sanders. It was recorded in New York City and Brooklyn, New York, and was released in 1996 by Verve Records. On the album, which was produced by Bill Laswell, Sanders is joined by kora player Foday Musa Suso, guitarist Dominic Kanza, violinist Michael White, keyboardists William Henderson, Jeff Bova, and Bernie Worrell, bassists Charnett Moffett and Steve Neil, and percussionists Aiyb Dieng and Hamid Drake.

Reception

In a review for AllMusic, Richard S. Ginell wrote: "The world music-minded producer Bill Laswell gets a hold of Pharoah Sanders here and lo, the sleeping volcano erupts with one of his most fulfilling albums in many a year... This resurrection will quicken the pulse of many an old Pharoah fan."

The authors of The Penguin Guide to Jazz Recordings called the album "a disappointment after the high of Crescent With Love," and stated: "Sanders sounds almost flabby and because he has surrounded himself with a mechanical, electronic sound, the weakness of the front line sinks in with every repeat hearing."

Robert Christgau commented: "this putatively commercial move ventures into the unknown. With his fabulous sound, un-American activities, and grandly simple musical ideas, the man was made for Bill Laswell's world-jazz strategems."

Writing for the Chicago Reader, Neil Tesser remarked that, with the album, Laswell "for once got it right," and noted: "while he used a modicum of modern tech wizardry and a few new dance beats to dress up the music for today, he clearly intended to return Sanders to the long-limbed spirituality of his 70s dates, and he succeeded."

CMJ New Music Monthly's James Lien stated that the album features "a heady range of musical styles," and "some of Pharoah's best playing in decades."

Track listing
"Kumba" composed by Pharoah Sanders and Foday Musa Suso. Remaining tracks composed by Pharoah Sanders.

 "Our Roots (Began in Africa)" – 10:21
 "Nozipho" – 9:43
 "Tomoki" – 6:26
 "Ocean Song" – 8:49
 "Kumba" – 7:50
 "Country Mile" – 6:03

Personnel 
 Pharoah Sanders – tenor saxophone, flute, bells, vocals, singing bowl
 Foday Musa Suso – kora, vocals
 Dominic Kanza – guitar
 Michael White – violin
 William Henderson – electric piano, piano, vocals
 Jeff Bova – keyboards
 Bernie Worrell – keyboards, vocals
 Charnett Moffett – acoustic bass
 Steve Neil – bass
 Aiyb Dieng – percussion, congas, bells, gong, vocals
 Hamid Drake – drums, tabla, percussion, vocals
 Fanta Mangasuba – backing vocals
 Fatumata Sako – backing vocals
 Mariama Suso – backing vocals
 Salie Suso – backing vocals

References

1996 albums
Pharoah Sanders albums
Verve Records albums
Albums produced by Bill Laswell